The 11101/02 Pune–Gwalior Weekly Express is an Express train of the Indian Railways connecting  in Maharashtra and  of Madhya Pradesh. It is currently being operated with 11101/11102 train numbers on a daily basis.

Service

11101/Pune–Gwalior Weekly Express has an average speed of 51 km/hr and covers 1368 km in 26 hrs 45 mins.

11102/Gwalior–Pune Weekly Express has an average speed of 47 km/hr and covers 1368 km in 29 hrs 05 mins.

Route and halts 

The important halts of the train are:

Coach composition

The train consists of 18 coaches:

 1 AC II Tier
 2 AC III Tier
 6 Sleeper coaches
 7 General Unreserved
 2 Seating cum Luggage Rake

Traction

Both trains are hauled by a Vadodara Loco Shed-based WAP-4E or Valsad Loco Shed-based WAG-5 electric locomotive from Pune to Ujjain and from Ujjain it is hauled by a Ratlam Loco Shed-based WDM-3A or WDP-4D diesel locomotive up til Gwalior.

Notes

External links 

 11101/Pune - Gwalior Weekly Express India Rail Info
 11102/Gwalior - Pune Weekly Express India Rail Info

References 

Express trains in India
Rail transport in Maharashtra
Rail transport in Madhya Pradesh
Rail transport in Gujarat
Transport in Gwalior
Transport in Pune
Railway services introduced in 2014